The 1958 Michigan Wolverines football team represented the University of Michigan in the 1958 Big Ten Conference football season. In its 11th and final year under head coach Bennie Oosterbaan, Michigan compiled a 2–6–1 record (1–5–1 against conference opponents), finished in eighth place in the Big Ten, and were outscored by opponents by a combined total of 211 to 132.

The team got off to a promising start with a 20–19 victory over USC and a 12–12 tie with a Michigan State team that was ranked No. 2 in the Coaches Poll. After two games, Michigan was ranked No. 12 in the Coaches Poll. The team then lost six of its final seven games. Bennie Oosterbaan resigned after the 1958 season.

Fullback John Herrnstein was the team captain, and quarterback Bob Ptacek received the team's most valuable player award. The team's statistical leaders included Bob Ptacek with 763 passing yards, left halfback Darrell Harper with 309 rushing yards, and left end Gary Prahst with 313 receiving yards.

Schedule

Season summary

USC

    
    
    
    
    
    

On September 27, 1958, Michigan defeated USC, 20–19, before a crowd of 77,005 at Michigan Stadium in Ann Arbor, Michigan.

Fullback and captain John Herrnstein rushed for 144 yards and two touchdowns on 26 carries. Herrnstein's first touchdown came on Michigan's first possession. Michigan started the drive on the USC 37-yard line after Gary Prahst partially blocked a punt. Michigan led, 14–7, at halftime and 20–7 at the end of the third quarter. The fourth quarter began with USC at Michigan's one-yard line, but USC halfback Rex Johnston fumbled on the goal line, and Michigan recovered the ball. Later in the quarter, Johnston ran 67 yards for a touchdown, but Johnston missed the extra-point kick, narrowing Michigan's lead to 20–13. On its next drive, Tom Maudlin threw a 36-yard touchdown pass to Hilliard Hill. USC lined up in kick formation for the extra point, but a late substitution cost them five yards. On the next play, an illegal procedure penalty pushed USC back to the 13-yard line. USC then shifted out of the kick formation, and Maudlin threw to Bob Arnett in an attempted two point conversion, but Arnett was tackled at the seven-yard line.

Statistical leaders
Michigan's individual statistical leaders for the 1958 season include those listed below.

Rushing

Passing

Receiving

Kickoff returns

Punt returns

Personnel

Letter winners
The following 40 players received varsity letters for their participation on the 1958 team. Players who started at least four games are shown with their names in bold.

 John Batsakes, 5'8", 172 pounds, senior, Ann Arbor, MI - halfback
 Jared Bushong, 6'2", 209 pounds, junior, Toledo, OH – started 1 game at right tackle
 Reid J. Bushong, 6'1", 179 pounds, sophomore, Toledo, OH - halfback
 James Byers, 6'0", 198 pounds, senior, Evansville, IN - center
 Alex Callahan, 6'0", 195 pounds, senior, Wyandotte, MI – started 9 games at left guard
Donald R. Deskins, 6'2", 241 pounds, sophomore, Jamaica, NY – started 8 games at right tackle
 James Dickey, 6'1", 191 pounds, senior, Miamisburg, OH – started 9 games at center
 Michael Fillichio, 5'10", 190 pounds, junior, River Forest, IL - guard
George Genyk, 6'1", 200 pounds, junior, Detroit – started 9 games at left tackle
 James P. Gray, 6'3", 233 pounds, senior, Battle Creek, MI - tackle
 Alvin Groce, 5'11", 166 pounds, junior, Clairton, PA - halfback
 John Halstead, 6'2", 205 pounds, sophomore, Bay City, MI - end
 Darrell Harper, 6'1", 195 pounds, junior, Royal Oak, MI – started 3 games at left halfback
 John Herrnstein, 6'2", 215 pounds, senior, Chillicothe, OH – started 3 games at fullback
 Willard R. Hildebrand, 6'2", 216 pounds, sophomore, Chillicothe, OH - tackle
 E. Thomas Jobson, 6'0", 201 pounds, sophomore, Flint, MI - guard
 Robert Johnson, 6'2", 199 pounds, senior, Chicago - end 
 Walter N. Johnson, 6'2", 214 pounds, senior, Dearborn, MI – started 9 games at right end	
 Fred Julian, 5'9", 184 pounds, junior, Detroit – started 9 games at right halfback	
 Gary F. Kane, 6'2", 215 pounds, sophomore, Elgin, IL - end
 William MacPhee, 6'0", 191 pounds, senior, Grand Haven, MI - center
 Jerry Marcinak, 6'2", 236 pounds, Chicago – started 9 games at right guard
 Gary McNitt, 5'9", 196 pounds, sophomore, Mesick, MI - halfback
 Brad Myers, 6'0", 196 pounds, junior, Evanston, IL – started 6 games at left halfback
 Harry Newman Jr., 5'9", 185 pounds, sophomore, Franklin, MI - halfback
 Stan Noskin, 5'11", 180 pounds, junior, Chicago - quarterback
 Douglas F. Oppman, 5'10", 192 pounds, junior, Gary, IN - guard
 Paul Poulos, 5'11", 198 pounds, junior, Freedom, PA - guard
 Gary Prahst, 6'4", 220 pounds, senior, Berea, OH – started 9 games at left end	 
Bob Ptacek, 6'1", 204 pounds, senior, Cleveland – started 9 games at quarterback
 Gene Sisinyak, 6'0", 195 pounds, sophomore, Monroe, MI – started 4 games at fullback
 Gerald Smith, 5'11", 185 pounds, junior, Detroit - center
 Willie Smith, 6'2", 243 pounds, senior, Little Rock, AR – tackle
 John Spidel, 5'11", 180 pounds, senior, Greenville, OH - quarterback
 Maynard Stetten, 6'2", 206 pounds, senior, Gibraltar, MI - tackle
 William R. Stine, 6'1", 215 pounds, sophomore, Toledo, OH - tackle
 Richard Syring, 6'0", 189 pounds, sophomore, Bay City, OH - center
 James Sytek, 5'11", 194 pounds, senior, Detroit - quarterback
 John C. Walker, 6'0", 195 pounds, sophomore, Milford, MI - fullback
 John Zachary, 5'9", 174 pounds, senior, Chicago - halfback

Non-letter winners
 Tony Rio, 6'0", 189 pounds, senior, Chicago – started 2 games at fullback

Freshmen
 George Mans, 6'4", 205 pounds, Trenton, MI - end
 Bennie McRae, 6'0", 170 pounds, Newport News, VA - halfback
 John Stamos, 6'2", 200 pounds, Chicago - quarterback
 Bill Tunnicliff, 6'1", 200 pounds, Ferndale, MI - fullback

Coaches and staff
Head coach: Bennie Oosterbaan
Assistant coaches: 
 Jack Blott - line coach
 Don Dufek, Sr. - freshman coach
 Bump Elliott - backfield coach
 Bob Hollway - assistant line coach
 Cliff Keen - assistant football coach, head wrestling coach
 Matt Patanelli - end coach
 Wally Weber - recruiting and eligibility
Trainer: Jim Hunt
Equipment manager - Henry Hatch
Manager: Tom Hitchman

Awards and honors
Team honors and awards for the 1958 season went to the following individuals.
Captain: John Herrnstein
Most Valuable Player: Bob Ptacek
Meyer Morton Award: Dick Syring
John Maulbetsch Award: John Walker

References

Michigan
Michigan Wolverines football seasons
Michigan Wolverines football